Puntius viridis, the spot-fin green barb, is a species of barbs native to the Manimala River in Kerala, India.This species reaches a length of .

References

viridis
Taxa named by Mathews Plamoottil
Taxa named by Nelson P. Abraham
Fish described in 2014